Although research into optical data storage has been ongoing for many decades, the first popular system was the Compact Disc, introduced in 1982, adapted from audio (CD-DA) to data storage (the CD-ROM format) with the 1985 Yellow Book, and re-adapted as the first mass market optical storage medium with CD-R and CD-RW in 1988. Compact Disc is still the de facto standard for audio recordings, although its place for other multimedia recordings and optical data storage has largely been superseded by DVD.

DVD (initially an initialism abbreviation of "Digital Video Disc," then modified to "Digital Versatile Disc," then officially just "DVD") was the mass-market successor to CD. DVD was rolled out in 1996, again initially for video and audio. DVD recordable formats developed some time later: DVD-R in late 1997 and DVD+R in 2002. Although DVD was initially intended to prevent a format war in fact one did arise between these two formats. It was resolved with both surviving however: DVD-R predominating for stand-alone DVD recorders and players, and (for computers) most DVD devices being engineered as dual format, to be compatible with both.

With the development of high-definition television, and the popularization of broadband and digital storage of movies, a further format development took place, again giving rise to two camps: HD DVD and Blu-ray Disc, based upon a switch from red to blue-violet laser and tighter engineering tolerances. After suffering a number of significant losses to Blu-ray, Toshiba announced their withdrawal from HD DVD on 19 February 2008.

In 2004, development of the Holographic Versatile Disc (HVD) commenced, which promised the storage of several terabytes of data per disc. However, development stagnated towards the late 2000s due to lack of funding.

In 2006, it was reported that Japanese researchers developed ultraviolet ray lasers with a wave length of 210 nanometers, which would enable a higher bit density than Blu-ray discs. As of 2022, no updates on that project have been reported.

, future development beyond Blu-ray Disc appear to be based upon one or more of the following technologies, all in varying stages of development:
 Holographic data storage.
 3D optical data storage.
 Near-field optics
 Solid immersion optics (allowing an extremely high numerical aperture).
 Discs utilizing very short wavelengths such as UV or X-rays.
 Layer selection discs (LS-R).
 Multi-level technology.
 Complex pit shapes allowing multiple channels to be stored on one track.
 Wavelength multiplexing techniques.

As of 2020, 5D optical data storage has the potential to store hundreds of terabytes of data for thousands of years.

References

Optical storage media
Optical computer storage
Optical storage